The name Southwestern Community College is shared by several campuses in several states in the United States:
Southwestern College in Chula Vista, California
Southwestern Community College (North Carolina), Sylva, North Carolina
Southwestern Community College (Iowa), Creston, Iowa, with extension campuses in Osceola and Red Oak

See also
Southwest University (disambiguation)
Southwest College, a community college in Houston, Texas
Southwestern University (disambiguation)
Southwestern College (disambiguation)
Southwestern Community College (disambiguation)